May 30 - Eastern Orthodox Church calendar - June 1

All fixed commemorations below celebrated on June 13 by Orthodox Churches on the Old Calendar.

For May 31, Orthodox Churches on the Old Calendar commemorate the Saints listed on May 18.

Saints
 Apostle Hermes of Philippopolis (Hermas), of the Seventy Apostles (1st century)
 Martyr Hermias of Comana (160)
 Martyr Magus (the Magician), who converted upon witnessing the martyrdom of Hermias (160)
 Martyr Philosophus at Alexandria (252)
 Martyrs Eusebios and Charalampos, in Nicomedia, by fire. (see also May 30)
 Five Martyrs of Ashkelon, dragged to death.
 Saint Eustathius, Patriarch of Constantinople (1025)

Pre-Schism Western saints
 Virgin-martyr Petronilla, at Rome (1st or 3rd century)
 Martyr Crescentian, in Sassari in Sardinia (c. 130) 
 Martyrs Cantius, Cantian, Cantianilla and Protus, in Aquileia (304)
 Saint Lupicinus of Verona, Bishop of Verona, described as  'the most holy, the best of bishops'  (5th century)
 Saint Paschasius, Deacon and Confessor in Rome, who is mentioned by Pope Gregory I (512)
 Saint Winnow, Mancus and Myrbad, Irish saints who lived in Cornwall where churches are dedicated to them (6th century)

Post-Schism Orthodox saints
 Saint Philotheus (Leschynsky) of Tobolsk, Metropolitan of Tobolsk and the "Apostle of Siberia" (1727)

New martyrs and confessors
 Hieromartyr Archpriest Philosophus (Ornatsky), with his sons Boris and Nicholas, in St. Petersburg (1918)
 Hieromartyrs Hierotheus (Afonin), Bishop of Nikolsk (1928), and Hieroschemamonk Seraphim (Nikolsky) (1923)

Other commemorations
 First translation of the relics (1591) of Hieromartyr Philip II, Metropolitan of Moscow and all Russia (1569), to Solovki.
 Repose of Archimandrite Macarius of Peshnosha Monastery, disciple of Blessed Theodore of Sanaxar (1811)
 Finding of the relics (1960) of New Martyr Nicholas the Deacon, of Mytilene (1463)

Icon gallery

Notes

References

Sources 
 May 31/June 13. Orthodox Calendar (PRAVOSLAVIE.RU).
 June 13 / May 31. HOLY TRINITY RUSSIAN ORTHODOX CHURCH (A parish of the Patriarchate of Moscow).
 Complete List of Saints. Protection of the Mother of God Church (POMOG).
 May 31. OCA - The Lives of the Saints.
 Dr. Alexander Roman. May. Calendar of Ukrainian Orthodox Saints (Ukrainian Orthodoxy - Українське Православ'я).
 May 31. Latin Saints of the Orthodox Patriarchate of Rome.
 May 31. The Roman Martyrology.
Greek Sources
 Great Synaxaristes:  31 ΜΑΪΟΥ. ΜΕΓΑΣ ΣΥΝΑΞΑΡΙΣΤΗΣ.
  Συναξαριστής. 31 Μαΐου. ECCLESIA.GR. (H ΕΚΚΛΗΣΙΑ ΤΗΣ ΕΛΛΑΔΟΣ). 
Russian Sources
  13 июня (31 мая). Православная Энциклопедия под редакцией Патриарха Московского и всея Руси Кирилла (электронная версия). (Orthodox Encyclopedia - Pravenc.ru).
  31 мая (ст.ст.) 13 июня 2013 (нов. ст.). Русская Православная Церковь Отдел внешних церковных связей. (DECR).

May in the Eastern Orthodox calendar